Liam Belcher (born 28 April 1996) is a Welsh rugby union player who plays at hooker for the Cardiff Rugby. He was a Wales under-20 international.

Having come through the Cardiff academy, Belcher made his senior professional debut for the Blue and Blacks in the Anglo-Welsh Cup during the 2014-15 season. He made a total of five appearances (all in the Anglo-Welsh cup) for Cardiff in his first stint, playing most of his rugby in this period for Merthyr RFC and Pontypridd RFC in the Welsh Premier Division. He was released at the end of the 2016-17 season and signed for rival region the Dragons, making a total of fifteen appearances across all competitions. He was released however by the Dragons at the end of the 2017-18 season only to re-sign for Cardiff, establishing himself as a regular member of the senior squad.

References

External links 
Dragons profile

Welsh rugby union players
Dragons RFC players
Cardiff Rugby players
Merthyr RFC players
Pontypridd RFC players
Living people
1996 births
Rugby union hookers